Hagensia is a small genus of ants in the subfamily Ponerinae. Its two species are known only from coastal areas in South Africa. Workers are large (10.5–13.0 mm); queens are unknown, but gamergates (reproductive female workers)  occurs in both species.

Species
Hagensia havilandi (Forel, 1901)
Hagensia peringueyi (Emery, 1899)

References

Ponerinae
Ant genera
Hymenoptera of Africa